Unnidathil Ennai Koduthen is a 1998 Indian Tamil-language romantic drama film written and directed by Vikraman. It stars Karthik and Roja, with Ajith Kumar in a guest appearance. Ramesh Khanna, Moulee, Sathyapriya, Fathima Babu, and Madhan Bob play other supporting roles. It was Karthik's 100th film. The film released on 15 August 1998. This movie was a huge commercial success and ran over 250 days across Tamilnadu. This movie marked as "Best of 1998". A complete family entertainer, it won the hearts of many and Ajith's cameo was widely appreciated.

Plot
Selvam and his friend Bhaskar are petty thieves, who live their lives by stealing stuff from people. One day, they are assigned a job to steal a Ganesh Idol from the temple, for a man who had just moved into a new house, citing prosperity as a reason. The friends succeed in stealing the idol but are spotted by the people who start chasing them. They hide in a house and encounter Radha. Radha is a maid in the house and is looking after the owners' three children while the adults are away on pilgrimage tour. Radha and the kids lock the two of them in a room and order them to do stuff for three days. Radha, while spending time alone in the house with the guys, realise that they are not bad after all and develops a soft corner for Selvam and he in return, falls for her. The guys are released after three days, the day the owners are to return.
Bhaskar steals Radha's handbag which contains her diary. Selvam reads the diary and finds out that Radha is the illegitimate daughter of Vishwanathan. After her mother's death, Radha meets her father who accepts her as his daughter but has to bring her into the house as a maid. Vishwanathan's second wife and her sister take an instant dislike for Radha. They treat her with utter disgust and blame her for the tiniest of the things. Vishwanathan plans to arrange the marriage between Sanjay, his brother-in-law and Radha. But Sanjay says that he would have to think about it and asks for three months time. Radha waits for his reply. Selvam, after reading her diary, feels pity on her and tries to change his ways by working responsibly after Radha's advice. He also hides his feelings for her.

After returning from the trip, Vishwanathan's wife finds out that her diamond necklace is missing. When looking for it, she finds a cigarette bud in one of the drawers and scolds Radha. She chases her out. Selvam who comes to return her bag, finds out and helps her to accommodate in a hostel. He does many petty works to pay the hostel fees and help Radha. One day, Selvam finds about Radha's singing talent and tries to help her move on with it. He encounters music director Gangai Amaran late one night and helps him repair his car. In return, he asks the director to help Radha out. Radha, after singing a few songs, becomes successful in her singing career and becomes rich. She stays in her bungalow with Selvam and Bhaskar.
During an interview, Radha refrains from saying her father's name. Upset, Vishwanathan reveals that he is the father. His wife, looking at Radha's money, accepts Radha as her daughter as well. They come to stay at her house. Vishwanathan's wife does not like Selvam and Bhaskar staying with them. They plan the wedding of Sanjay and Radha, as Sanjay had accepted to marry Radha, long time back. When Radha had gone out of town with Sanjay, to receive an award, Vishwanathan's wife and sister-in-law stage a drama that Selvam stole Radha's money and chase him and Bhaskar out. Radha comes back and is shocked. She finds Selvam's diary in his room and understands his love for her.

During an award ceremony, Radha reveals that the reason for her success is not her family but Selvam and she had fallen in love with him. She also tells her desire to marry him. Selvam who had arrived there to drop a passenger, sees it and is called upon the stage when Radha sees him in a TV. In a flashback, it is shown that Radha had informed Sanjay and Vishwanathan about her love for Selvam and how Sanjay had accepted it. Selvam and Radha leave the place hand in hand.

Cast

 Karthik as Selvam
 Roja as Radha
 Ramesh Khanna as Bhaskar, Selvam's friend
 Moulee as Viswanathan, Radha's father
 Sathyapriya as. Janaki, Radha's stepmother
 Madhan Bob as Mahadevan, Radha's uncle
 Fathima Babu as Vasanthi, Radha's aunt
 Vaiyapuri as Delhi
 Singamuthu as Police constable
 Kovai Senthil as House owner
 Sheela
 Uma
 K. Natraj
 Hemalatha
 Ajith Kumar as Sanjay (guest appearance)
 Ambika as Radha's mother (guest appearance)
Special appearances in "Vaanambadiyin" song
 Gangai Amaran
 Sarathkumar
 K. S. Ravikumar
 Khushbu
 S. A. Rajkumar
 Deva

Production 

After having a 1996 success with the Karthik film Gokulathil Seethai, Lakshmi Movie Makers began their sixth production and launched a film with director Vikraman in February 1998. Unnidathil Ennai Koduthen was set to feature Vijay in the lead role, whom Vikraman worked with in Poove Unakkaga, but production delays meant that the actor was replaced by Karthik. Though Meena was the initial choice for producers, she had to be replaced as Vikraman insisted on casting Roja.  Swathi was initially approached to appear in a single song sequence for the film, but her refusal led to Anusha being chosen.

Ajith Kumar later revealed that his role in the film was initially supposed to be a full-length role but the character underwent changes after the film started. He continued to play his guest part in the film due to his admiration for his co-actor, Karthik. The success of Unnidathil Ennai Koduthen later led to Karthik making a guest appearance in the Ajith film Anantha Poongatre (1999).

Soundtrack

The soundtrack of the film was composed by S. A. Rajkumar, who also played a cameo as himself in the film alongside the music directors Gangai Amaren and Deva. "Edho Oru Paattu" was later used in the Hindi film Mann as "Chaha Hai Tujhko".

Release
The film was released on 15 August 1998.

Awards

Remakes

References

External links
 

1998 films
Tamil films remade in other languages
1990s Tamil-language films
Indian romantic drama films
1998 romantic drama films
Films directed by Vikraman
Films scored by S. A. Rajkumar